The Indiana High School Athletic Association (IHSAA) is the arbiter of interscholastic competition among public and private high schools in the U.S. state of Indiana. It monitors a system that divides athletically-competing high schools in Indiana based on the school's enrollment. The divisions, known as classes, are intended to foster fair competition among schools of similar sizes. A school ranked 3A is larger than a school ranked 1A, but not as large as a 6A-ranked school. Only football has 6 classes. Boys' basketball, girls' basketball, volleyball, baseball and softball are divided into four classes. Boys' and girls' soccer have featured three classes since the 2017–18 school year. All other sports compete in a single class.

Structure

The IHSAA is divided into three board of director districts: northern, central, and southern. For the state tournament, there are two divisions. The northern district is composed of 21 of Indiana's counties consisting the northern third of Indiana. The southern district is composed of the remaining 71 counties and includes all of the Indianapolis area except Boone, Hamilton, and Madison counties. It is from these two districts, the top two teams meet at the state finals usually held in or around Indianapolis.

In the regular season, most of the member-schools' sports activities are governed by one, sometimes two or even three of Indiana's 51 athletic conferences. Some conferences only offer one sport while the school participates in a primary conference for all other sports. Other schools maintain independence in certain sports, like football or basketball.

Some smaller sports are governed by other organizations in Indiana. For example, boys' ice hockey is under the auspices of the Indiana State High School Hockey Association (ISHSHA). High school hockey in Indiana is concentrated in the northern portion of the state, around Indianapolis, plus a few other areas, such as Columbus and Evansville.

Primary Athletic Conferences

Allen County
Blue Chip
Central Indiana Athletic
Circle City Conference
Conference Indiana
Duneland Athletic
Eastern Indiana Athletic
Great Lakes Athletic
Greater South Shore Athletic
Hoosier Athletic
Hoosier Crossroads
Hoosier Heartland
Hoosier Heritage
Hoosier Hills
Hoosier North
Indiana Crossroads
Indianapolis Public
Metropolitan Interscholastic
Mid-Eastern
Mid-Hoosier
Mid-Indiana
Midland
Mid-Southern
Mid-State
Midwest Athletic
North Central Athletic
Northeast Corner
Northeast Eight
Northern Indiana Athletic
Northern Lakes
Northern State
Northland
Northwest Crossroads
Northwestern
Ohio River Valley
Patoka Lake
Pocket Athletic
Porter County
Sagamore
Southern Athletic
Southern Indiana Athletic
Southern Roads (Effective 2018-19)
Southwest Indiana
Summit Athletic
Three Rivers
Tri-Eastern
Tri-River
Wabash River
Western Indiana

Secondary Sport-Specific Conferences
Mid-Indiana Football
Southwest Seven Football

Independents
IHSAA Independents

Controversy 
In 2010, the association faced a state lawsuit over the scheduling of girls’ basketball games, which some programs believed disadvantaged girls’ teams by giving more favorable dates and times to boys’ programs. The association won the case when an Indiana judge ruled the schedule was not discriminatory.

See also
 Hoosier Hysteria
 Largest high school gyms in the United States
Arthur Trester

References

External links 
 Indiana High School Athletic Association
 IHSAA School Directory - Part I
 IHSAA School Directory - Part II

 
Education in Indiana
High school sports associations in the United States
Sports organizations established in 1903
High school sports in Indiana
Non-profit organizations based in Indianapolis
1903 establishments in Indiana